This is a comprehensive list of functional appliances that are used in the field of orthodontics. The functional appliances can be divided into fixed and removable. The fixed functional appliances have to be bonded to the teeth by an orthodontist. A removable functional appliance does not need to be bonded on the teeth and can be removed by the patient. A removable appliance is usually used by patients who have high degree of compliance with their orthodontic treatment. Fixed appliances are able to produce very accurate movement in the teeth 

Both fixed and removable functional appliances can be used to correct a malocclusion in three planes: Anterior-Posterior, Vertical and Transverse.

In the Anterior-Posterior dimension, appliances such as Class II and Class III are used. Appliances used in transverse dimension are utilized to expand either the maxillary or the mandibular arch. Appliances used in the vertical dimension are used to correct open or deep bite.

History 
It is important to note that initially dento-facial Orthopaedics was mainly done in Europe.  The United States was introduced to Fixed Orthodontics by Edward Angle. Norman William Kingsley was the first person to show "jumping the bite" by using an anterior bite plate. Hotz then developed the Vorbissplate which was a modification of Kingsley's plate. Wilhelm Roux is credited with being the first person who studied the effects of functional forces on Orthodontics in 1883. His workings were then used by other dentists studying dental orthopaedics. His teachings became known as Roux Hypothesis, which Karl Haupl later expanded upon. The Monobloc was developed by Pierre Robin (surgeon) in 1902 and is considered to be one of the first functional appliances in Orthodontics. The Monobloc was a modification of Ottolengui's removable plate. In 1908, Viggo Andersen developed the Activator appliance. This was the first functional appliance to be widely accepted, especially in Europe. This appliance became the "Norwegian" system of treatment in Orthodontics in the early 1900s.

In addition, in 1905 the Herbst Appliance was introduced by Emil Herbst. This appliance did not go through much evolution until the 1970s when Hans Pancherz revived interest in it. In the 1950s, Wilhem Balters modified Andersen's Activator appliance and gave the new appliance the name Bionator Appliance, which was designed to produce forward positioning of the mandible. The Positioner Appliance was developed by Harold Kesling in 1944 in order to aid the orthodontic treatment during the finishing stage. The Frankel appliance were developed by Rolf Frankel in 1957 for treatment of Class I, II, III Malocclusions . William Clark also developed Twin Block Appliance in 1978 which resembled Artur Martin Schwarz double plates that he developed in the 1950s.

Fixed appliances

Distalization appliances
 "New" Distalizer
 Pasin-Pin-System
 Barrel Fixed 3-Way
 Beneslider
 CD Distalizer Nance Appliance with Coil Springs
 Carriere Motion 3D
 Crickett Appliance
 Crozat Appliance
 Distal Jet
 Fast Back Appliance
 First Class Appliance
 Greenfield Molar Distalizer (Piston Appliance)
 Intraoral Body Molar Distalizer (IBMD)
 Jones Jig
 Keles Slider
 Korn Lip Bumper
 K Loop Appliance
 Lokar Appliance
 Mandibular Anterior Repositioning Appliance (MARA)
 Molar Distalization Bow
 Multi-Distalizing Arch
 Pendulum appliance
 P-Rax Molar Distalizer
 Simplified Molar Distalizer (FROG)
 T-Rex
 Veltri's Distalizer
 Vertical Holding Appliance
 Wilson's Bimetric Distalizing Arch

Class II appliances
 Amoric Torsion Coil
 Herbst Appliance
 MiniscopeTM Telescoping Herbst
 Malu Herbst Appliance
 MARA Appliance 
 Jasper Jumper 
 Eureka Spring 
 Carriere Motion 3D Appliance
 Twin Force Bite Corrector 
 Churro Jumper 
 Klapper Super Spring 
 Scandee Tubular Jumper 
 Magnetic Telescopic Device 
 Bionator Appliance 
 Higgins Xbow
 PowerScope 2
 Forsus Appliance
 Ventral Telescope
 IST Appliance
 Biopedic Appliance
 LM-Activator
 BioBiteCorrector
 Fixed Lingual Mandibular Growth Modificator (FLMGM)

Class III appliances 
 Quick Fix
 Modified Tandem Appliances (MTA)
 Class III Tandem Bow
 Carriere® Motion™ Appliance for Class III Correction
 Face Mask

Intrusion appliances
 Rapid Molar Intruder

Mesialization appliances 
 Mesial Jet
 T Bar Appliance

Vertical Dimension appliances 
 Thurow Appliance
 Modified Thurow Appliance

Removable Appliances

Components 
Some of the components of removal appliances are retentive in nature. They are usually connecting by an acrylic component known as baseplate. The majority of the appliances include components such as Labial Bow and Adams Clasp, both of these components are passive in nature. Labial bow is a wire attached to the baseplate which goes around the incisor teeth to provide retention of those teeth. Labial bow usually have U-Loops at the end to allow it to activate more. Adams clasps are used for retention of these removable appliances and are usually fabricated in the molar areas. They are usually manufactured from 0.7mm hard stainless steel wire (HSSW), or 0.6mm HSSW when planned for deciduous teeth. Removal of the appliance is usually performed by holding the bridge of this clasp. Other clasps that are usually used are C clasps on canines, Southend Clasp (on anteriors), Ball-ended clasp (primarily for use with the Twin Block system in the lower anteriors) and Plint clasp.

Active components of removable appliances include springs which provides light forces on a tooth to move it orthodontically. Components such as Palatal Finger Springs, Buccal Canine Retractor, Z-Spring, T-Spring, Coffin Spring, Active Labial Bows (Mill's Bow or Roberts retractor), Screws and Elastics are all considered to be active components of the removable functional appliances. If a spring is moving one tooth it is made of 0.5mm thick stainless steel wire. The thickness increases to 0.6 or 0.7mm wire if it is to move more teeth or a larger/multi rooted tooth.
 Palatal Finger Spring - These springs are used to move teeth buccally or lingually.  
 Buccal Canine Retractor - These springs are used to bring a buccally placed canine more lingual.  
 Z-Spring - This spring is used to move one or two teeth labially 
 T-Spring - This spring is used to move teeth labially.  
 Coffin Spring - This spring is used for expansion and can be substituted instead of a screw in an expansion device. They apply heavy forces and is activated by flattening the spring.

Class II Appliances
 Twin-Block Appliance
 Frankel II
 Mono-Bloc Appliance
 Rickonator
 Dynamax Appliance
 R-Appliance
 Anterior Inclined Bite Plate (AIBP)
 Schwarz Double Plate 
 Activator appliance
 Split Activator (Bow activator)
 Eschler's Modification
 Harvold - Woodside Activator 
 Herren's Activator (1953) 
 Occlus-o-Guide®, Nite-Guide®, and Ortho-T® preformed activators/positioners
 H-Activator 
 Klammt Activator  
 LM-Activator  
 LSU Activator 
 V-Activator 
 Schwarz Activator 
 Medium Opening Activator 
Expansion and labial segment alignment appliance (ELSAA)
PAM - Guias Póstero-Anterior Marinho (Brasil)
Propulsor de Rossi (Brasil)
Simões Network - SN (Brasil)

Class III Appliances
 Eganhouse Class III Appliance
 Frankel III
PAM - Guias Póstero-Anterior Marinho (Brasil)
Simões Network - SN (Brasil)

Transverse Appliances
 Frankel I, II, IV
PAM - Guias Póstero-Anterior Marinho (Brasil)
Simões Network - SN (Brasil)

Distalization Appliances 
 Acrylic Cervical Occipital Anchorage Appliance (ACCO)
 Removable Molar distalization splint

Orthodontic/Deprogramming Splints 
 Dorsal Splint
 Superior Repositioning Splint
 Farrar Splint
 Maxillary Anterior Deprogrammer
 Maxillary Flat Plane
 Stack Bionator
 Luco Splint
 Gelb Splint/MORA
 Modified Gelb Splint
 Tanner Repositioning Splint
 Pull Forward Splint
 Flat Occlusal Plane Splint
 Mini Deprogrammer
 "B" Splint (Wilkerson Style)
 Cranham Deprogrammer
 Kois Deprogrammer
 Full Contact Splint with Anterior Guidance
 Pankey Style
 Brucia/FACE Style
 Dawson Style
 Spear Style

See also 
 List of palatal expanders
 Molar distalization
 Palatal expansion
 Mandibular expansion or lower jaw expansion
 Functional_appliances

References

 
Orthodontic appliances